Ezzatollah Pourghaz, (born 21 March 1987 in Bandar Torkaman, Iran) is an Iranian footballer who played for Havadar in the Persian Gulf Pro League and the Iran national football team.

Personal life
Pourghaz is of Iranian Turkmen origin.

Club career

Iranjavan
On September 25, 2013 Ezzatollah made his debut against Naft Gachsaran which turned 2–2. He was one of a key players, played 21 matches and was one of the best defenders in the team. In his team he got the least cards, as he only got 2 yellow cards.

Malavan
He signed his contract with Malavan on 2014. He made his Malavan debut and Persian Gulf Pro League debut in a match against one of the big teams in Iran: Sepahan, the game turned 1–1.

Senior team 
Pourghaz made his debut on 12 November 2015 against Turkmenistan in the 2018 World Cup qualifications. On 17 November 2015 he had to play the last 20 minutes of Iran's match against Guam as a goalkeeper as teammate Alireza Beiranvand was sent off and Iran were out of substitutes, the match finished as a 6–0 victory for Iran.

References

1987 births
Living people
Iranian footballers
Etka Gorgan players
Iranjavan players
Malavan players
Iranian Turkmen people
People from Golestan Province
Iran international footballers
Association football central defenders